One Night of Sin is the twelfth studio album by English singer Joe Cocker, released by Capitol Records in June 1989. It contains the hit single "When The Night Comes" (US #11), which was Cocker's last US Top 40 hit and played at the end credits of Tom Selleck's crime drama An Innocent Man of that same year. The song is also notable because it was written by Bryan Adams and Jim Vallance. In addition, the former plays rhythm guitar on the song. Other notable songs on the album include a cover of "One Night" (here as "One Night of Sin"), a #1 hit by Elvis Presley from 1958, and "I'm Your Man" by Leonard Cohen. The album also features "Another Mind Gone", which was the first album track in thirteen years co-written by Cocker— in the interim, he had also received songwriting credits for the songs “We Stand Alone” (from the 1986 soundtrack to the film Wildcats) and “Now That You’re Gone” (from the soundtrack to the 1987 German film ). “Another Mind Gone” was dedicated to B. J. Wilson, Cocker's former bandmate and a friend.

Track listing
 "When the Night Comes" (Bryan Adams, Jim Vallance, Diane Warren) – 5:20
 "I Will Live for You" (Stephen Allen Davis) – 4:11
 "Got to Use My Imagination" (Gerry Goffin, Barry Goldberg) – 4:24
 "Letting Go" (Charlie Midnight, Jimmy Scott) – 4:11
 "Just to Keep from Drowning" (Marshall Chapman, Davis) – 4:39
 "Unforgiven" (Tim Hardin, Ken Lauber) – 3:28 – CD bonus track
 "Another Mind Gone" (Joe Cocker, Jeff Levine, Chris Stainton) – 4:44
 "Fever" (Eddie Cooley, John Davenport) – 3:37
 "You Know It's Gonna Hurt" (Rick Boston, Nick Gilder) – 3:59
 "Bad Bad Sign" (Dan Hartman, Midnight) – 4:09
 "I'm Your Man" (Leonard Cohen) – 3:52
 "One Night of Sin" (Dave Bartholomew, Pearl King) – 3:14

Personnel 
 Joe Cocker – lead vocals
 Jeff Levine – acoustic piano (1, 4-6, 8, 12), synthesizers (2, 3, 7, 9, 11), percussion (9), organ (10, 12)
 Chris Stainton – organ (1, 2, 5, 8), acoustic piano (3, 10, 11), synthesizers (4, 7, 9), arrangements (12)
 Phil Grande – guitar, guitar solo (1-5, 7-12)
 Bryan Adams – rhythm guitar (1)
 Jeff Pevar – guitar (2-5, 8, 9, 11), lead guitar solo (4), slide guitar (10)
 T. M. Stevens – bass
 David Beal – drums, percussion (1, 4, 7-12)
 Bashiri Johnson – percussion (2, 3, 5, 8, 10)
 Mario Cruz – saxophone (3, 5, 10)
 Frank Elmo – saxophone (3, 5, 10)
 Lenny Pickett – sax solo (3, 5)
 Deric Dyer – sax solo (6, 11)
 Crispin Cioe – saxophones (8, 10-12)
 Arno Hecht – saxophones (8, 10-12)
 Richie La Bamba – trombone (3, 5, 10)
 Bob Funk – trombone (8, 10-12), horn arrangements (8, 10-12)
 Mark Pender – trumpet (3, 5, 10), horn arrangements (3, 5, 10)
 "Hollywood" Paul Litteral – trumpet (8, 10-12)
 Tawatha Agee – backing vocals
 Curtis King – backing vocals
 Vaneese Thomas – backing vocals

Production 

 Producer – Charlie Midnight
 Executive Producers – Dan Hartman and Michael Lang 
 Co-Producer, Engineer and Mixing – John Rollo
 Assistant Engineers – Danny Grigsby, Lolly Grodner, Vicki Nemarich and Mike Weisinger.
 Recorded at Atlantic Studios (New York, NY).
 Additional recording at House of Music (West Orange, NJ).
 Mixed at Sigma Sound Studios (New York, NY).
 Remixed by Chris Lord-Alge
 Mastered by Bob Ludwig at Masterdisk (New York, NY).
 Art Direction – Tommy Steele
 Design – Norman Moore
 Photography – Timothy White 
 Management – Better Music, Inc.

Charts

Weekly charts

Year-end charts

Certifications

References

1989 albums
Joe Cocker albums
Capitol Records albums